Sala Santa Cecilia is the first collaborative release between Christian Fennesz and Ryuichi Sakamoto. It was recorded live on 28 November 2004 and released 5 July 2005 by Touch. Claudia Engelhart was responsible for recording this at the Auditorium della Parco Musica for the Romaeuropa Festival.

Track listing
"Sala Santa Cecilia" – 19:00

References

2005 EPs
Collaborative albums